Peter Huber may refer to:

 Peter Huber (diver) (born 1930), Austrian Olympic diver
 Peter J. Huber (born 1934), Swiss statistician
 Peter W. Huber (1952-2021), American lawyer